Squaretop Mountain is an  mountain summit located in Sublette County of  Wyoming, United States.

Geography 
The peak is the emblematic geographical feature of the remote Wind River Range and is set seven miles west of the Continental Divide. It is situated in the Bridger Wilderness on land managed by Bridger-Teton National Forest. The iconic view of Squaretop and Green River Lakes has been on the Wyoming licence plate since 2016.

Climate 
According to the Köppen climate classification system, Squaretop Mountain is located in an alpine subarctic climate zone with long, cold, snowy winters, and cool to warm summers. Due to its altitude, it receives precipitation all year, as snow in winter, and as thunderstorms in summer. Precipitation runoff from the mountain drains north into the Green River.

Climbing 

Fred Beckey and Layton Kor climbed the Northeast Face in 1960.

Other established climbing routes on Squaretop's walls:

 West Gully – 1937 –  – H. H. Bliss 
 East Face Center – 1958 – (IV 5th) – Bill Byrd, Dave Dingman, Roland Wyatt
 North Buttress – 1960 –  (III 5.7) – Ed Cooper, Ron Niccoli
 East Face Right – 1965 – (V 5.8) – Fred Beckey, Jerry Fuller
 Southeast Face – 1971 – (II 5.6) – Vince Lee, E. Park, M. Stephens, C. Zukowski
 West Couloir – 1972 – (II 5.5) – Vince Lee, Bo Beckham, Greg Smith
 West Face Dihedral – 1974 – (V 5.10) – Greg Lowe, Jeff Lowe, Kent Christensen
 East Face Left – 1984 – (V 5.10d) – Jeff Lowe, Renato Casarotto
 West Face Right – 1992 – (IV 5.9 A2) – Scott Cole, John Malken
 AC/DC – 1998 – (IV 5.10) – Andy Carson, Dan Carson
 Miscreant Line and Conveyor Belt (East Face) – 2001 – (V 5.10d) – Tod Anderson, Skyler Crane, James Donnell, Ernest Moskovics
 Marginally Orange – 2009 – (IV 5.10) Norm Goltra, Steve Walker

Hazards

Encountering bears is a concern in the Wind River Range. There are other concerns as well, including bugs, wildfires, adverse snow conditions and nighttime cold temperatures.

Importantly, there have been notable incidents, including accidental deaths, due to falls from steep cliffs (a misstep could be fatal in this class 4/5 terrain) and due to falling rocks, over the years, including 1993, 2007 (involving an experienced NOLS leader), 2015 and 2018. Other incidents include a seriously injured backpacker being airlifted near SquareTop Mountain in 2005, and a fatal hiker incident (from an apparent accidental fall) in 2006 that involved state search and rescue. The U.S. Forest Service does not offer updated aggregated records on the official number of fatalities in the Wind River Range.

Gallery

See also
 List of mountain peaks of Wyoming

References

External links 
 Squaretop Mountain rock climbing: Mountainproject.com
 Weather forecast: Squaretop Mountain

Bridger–Teton National Forest
Mountains of Sublette County, Wyoming
Mountains of Wyoming
North American 3000 m summits